Daddikamalapur is a village in Dharwad district of Karnataka, India.

Demographics 
As of the 2011 Census of India there were 113 households in Daddikamalapur and a total population of 634 consisting of 352 males and 282 females. There were 95 children ages 0-6.

References

Villages in Dharwad district